John William "Jake" Weimer (November 13, 1883 – November 30, 1940) was an American football, basketball, and baseball player and coach. He served as the head football coach at Allentown High School in Allentown, Pennsylvania during the 1919 season.

References

External links

1883 births
1940 deaths
Albany Babies players
Basketball coaches from Pennsylvania
Bloomsburg Huskies football coaches
Bloomsburg Huskies men's basketball coaches
DuBois Miners players
Gettysburg Patriots players
Harrisburg Senators players
New Castle Nocks players
New Orleans Pelicans (baseball) players
Oil City Oilers players
High school football coaches in Pennsylvania
People from Reading, Pennsylvania